New Labor Forum (E-) is a national labor journal of debate, analysis and new ideas. New Labor Forum is published by the CUNY Joseph S. Murphy Institute and SAGE Press, three times a year, in January, May, and September. Founded in 1997, the journal provides a place for labor and its allies to consider vital research, debate strategy, and test new ideas.

Overview
In its over two decades of publication, articles in the journal have covered the full range of challenges that confront workers and working-class communities.

On the domestic side, these issues have included:
 the dramatic growth of low wage service and precarious work
 the decline of manufacturing
 corporate domination in U.S. politics
 the privatization of public education
 the persistence of black unemployment at double or near double the rate for whites
 mass incarceration
 immigration raids and the super exploitation of immigrant workers
 sexual harassment at work
 pay inequity
 LGBTQ workplace discrimination
 labor’s relationship to the American empire and wars without end
 the climate change crisis.

Internationally, contributors to the journal have examined:
 organized labor and economic justice in post-Apartheid South Africa
 the rise and fall of the pink tide in Latin America
 efforts to organize among informal workers throughout the global south, and
 the rise of economic nationalism throughout Europe.

The journal provides a place for labor and its allies to introduce new ideas and debate old concepts. Recent contributors include: Andy Stern, Frances Fox Piven, Bill Fletcher, David Roediger, JoAnn Wypijewski, Jonathan Tasini, Ruth Milkman, and Maria Elena Durazo. Its editorial board is composed of a number of notable scholars, including Kate Bronfenbrenner, Joshua Freeman, and Paul Buhle. Each issue of the journal also includes a "Books and the Arts" section that publishes poetry and book/film reviews.

New Labor Forum has a subscription base of approximately 7,000 individuals and institutions.

New Labor Forum is often considered a critical journal of thought within the American labor movement.  For example, its January 2006 issue contained articles linked to the first-of-its-kind (and controversial) Global Unions Conference. In the winter of 2007, Robert Pollin, co-director of the Political Economy Research Institute at the University of Massachusetts Amherst, began a regular column in New Labor Forum titled "Economic Prospects." The AFL–CIO has cited New Labor Forum, although the magazine is often critical of that labor federation. Katrina vanden Heuvel, editor of The Nation magazine, called the journal "invaluable".

References

External links
New Labor Forum – official website

Magazines established in 1997
Triannual journals
Labour journals
Economics journals
English-language journals
1997 establishments in New York City
City University of New York